Romain Le Gac (born 31 May 1995) is a French-Canadian ice dancer who currently represents Canada with his partner and wife Marie-Jade Lauriault, in which capacity he is the 2022 Skate America bronze medallist.

Lauriault and Le Gac initially represented his birth country of France upon partnering in 2014, winning four silver medals at the French Championships and a national junior title, and representing France at the 2018 Winter Olympics. Internationally they won four Challenger medals, including gold at the 2019 CS Warsaw Cup, before switching to represent her birth country of Canada in the summer of 2021.

He previously competed with Estelle Elizabeth, winning two junior national titles and representing France at the inaugural Winter Youth Olympics.

Personal life 
Romain Le Gac was born on 31 May 1995 in Nogent-sur-Marne, France. He moved to Montreal, Quebec, Canada in July 2014. He married Marie-Jade Lauriault in December 2015. He has expressed interest in working as an osteopath.

Career

Early career 
Le Gac began skating in 2001. Disliking jumps, he switched from singles to ice dancing two years later.

Le Gac debuted on the junior international level with Estelle Elizabeth in the 2010–11 season. In January 2012, they represented France at the Winter Youth Olympics in Innsbruck, Austria, placing sixth in the short dance, fifth in the free dance, and fifth overall. They won bronze in the team event.

Elizabeth/Le Gac finished fifteenth at the 2013 World Junior Championships in Milan after ranking thirteenth in the short and eighteenth in the free dance. They placed eleventh in both segments and eleventh overall at the 2014 World Junior Championships in Sofia, Bulgaria. They were coached by Muriel Boucher-Zazoui, Romain Haguenauer, and Olivier Schoenfelder in Lyon. Their partnership ended around July 2014 due to personal problems.

2014–15 season: Debut of Lauriault/Le Gac 
Le Gac relocated with Haguenauer to Montreal, Quebec in July 2014 and was paired with Canadian ice dancer Marie-Jade Lauriault the same month. The two decided to represent France. They are coached by Haguenauer, Patrice Lauzon, Pascal Denis, and Marie-France Dubreuil in Montreal.

Lauriault/Le Gac competed on the senior level in the 2014–15 season. They won silver at the Open d'Andorra and finished ninth at the 2014 CS Golden Spin of Zagreb before taking silver at the French Championships.

2015–16 season: International junior season 
Lauriault/Le Gac decided to compete on the junior level in 2015–16. They won two medals on the Junior Grand Prix (JGP) series — silver in Linz, Austria and gold in Logroño, Spain. Their results gave them a spot at the JGP Final in Barcelona, where they finished fifth. 

In February 2016, Lauriault/Le Gac won gold at the French Junior Championships ahead of Abachkina/Thauron. In March, they represented France at the 2016 World Junior Championships in Debrecen, Hungary, and won a small bronze medal after placing third in the short dance. They finished eighth overall. Over eight days in April, they skated in ten ice shows in France.

2016–17 season: Grand Prix, European and World debuts 
Returning to the senior ranks for the pre-Olympic season, Lauriault/Le Gac placed fifth at the 2016 CS Autumn Classic International. They were then invited to make their senior Grand Prix debut, finishing sixth at both the 2016 NHK Trophy and the 2017 Internationaux de France.

After winning silver at the French championships for the second time at the senior level, Lauriault/Le Gac made their European Championship debut at the 2017 edition in Ostrava, coming twelfth. They won gold at the Cup of Nice before making their World Championship debut in Helsinki, finishing twenty-first in the rhythm dance and thereby narrowly missing the cut for the free dance. They were also invited to participate as part of Team France at the World Team Trophy, finishing sixth among dance teams while France also came sixth overall.

2017–18 season: Pyeongchang Olympics 

Sixth at the Autumn Classic to start the season, Lauriault/Le Gac were eighth at both the 2017 NHK Trophy and the 2017 Rostelecom Cup on the Grand Prix. They won silver at the French championships for the third time and, as a result, were named to the French team for the 2018 Winter Olympics in Pyeongchang. They finished twelfth at the 2018 European Championships shortly afterwards.

French national champions Papadakis/Cizeron declined to participate in the Olympic team event, allowing Lauriault/Le Gac to do so. They finished sixth in the rhythm dance segment, but Team France was tenth among ten teams after the first round and did not advance to the free portion of the competition. They then participated in the ice dance event, qualifying to the free dance and finishing seventeenth in their Olympic debut. Lauriault/Le Gac finished the season with a thirteenth-place finish at the post-Olympic World Championships in Milan.

2018–19 season: Challenger medals 
Lauriault/Le Gac won two medals on the Challenger series to begin the season, taking the bronze at both the 2018 CS Finlandia Trophy and the 2018 CS Inge Solar Memorial. On the Grand Prix, they finished fourth at the 2018 Skate Canada International, 6.65 points behind bronze medallists Gilles/Poirier of Canada. They were then sixth on home ice at the 2018 Internationaux de France.

French national silver medalists once again, Lauriault/Le Gac were tenth at the 2019 European Championships and fourteenth at the 2019 World Championships in Saitama.

2019–20 season: Struggles 
After a bronze medal win at the 2019 CS Autumn Classic International, Lauriault/Le Gac struggled in the early going, coming eighth at both the 2019 Skate America and the 2019 Internationaux de France. They won gold at the 2019 CS Warsaw Cup, their first Challenger title, but came fourth at the French championships and thus did not make the European Championship team. They were assigned to compete at the 2020 World Championships, to be held in Montreal near their training centre, but the event was cancelled due to the onset of the COVID-19 pandemic.

2021–22 season: Switch to Canada 
After not competing at all during the COVID-plagued 2020–21 season, Lauriault and Le Gac announced on June 6, 2021, that they would henceforth be representing her birth country of Canada. Lauriault would later say that it had been a difficult decision but that "with the pandemic, we certainly realized that we are very much at home in Canada, that our life is there. We felt that more and more as the years progressed, and Romain has established himself there as well. It is also complicated with me studying and Romain working in Canada."

After competing domestically in the fall, Lauriault/Le Gac qualified for the 2022 Canadian Championships, held without an audience in Ottawa due to the spread of the Omicron variant. They finished fifth in their first appearance at the Canadian nationals, with Lauriault saying, "it wasn't perfect, but it was what we were hoping for." Their result earned them an assignment to the 2022 Four Continents Championships in Tallinn. Competing at Four Continents, their first international event in two years, they were fifth after the rhythm dance but dropped to sixth when Lauriault fell on her twizzles in the free dance. Despite the "technical error", she insisted afterwards, "it was a great experience today; these are still good memories."

2022–23 season: First Grand Prix medal 
Beginning the season at the 2022 CS U.S. Classic, Lauriault/Le Gac finished in fourth place, 3.36 points behind American bronze medallists McNamara/Spiridonov. Given two Grand Prix assignments representing Canada for the first time, they competed first at the 2022 Skate America and won the bronze medal, their first Grand Prix medal. Le Gac said afterward that it was a significant competition for them because they had not competed on the Grand Prix since 2019, while Lauriault called it a "life-changing experience." They then appeared at the 2022 Skate Canada International the following weekend, setting new personal bests and finishing in fifth place.

Lauriault/Le Gac won the gold medal at the 2022–23 Skate Canada Challenge to qualify to the 2023 Canadian Championships. Lauriault said of the reception of their The Pink Panther program, "we've put so much work into our choreography this year, and we are pleased people are enjoying it as much as we enjoy performing it." They went on to win the bronze medal at the Canadian Championships, albeit with reigning Canadian national champions Gilles/Poirier absent due to illness. 

Despite their national bronze medal, Lauriault/Le Gac were not initially assigned to any ISU championships for the second half of the season, as Gilles/Poirier were expected to return in time. However, Gilles/Poirier subsequently withdrew from the 2023 Four Continents Championships, Lauriault/Le Gac were called up to replace them.

Programs

With Lauriault

With Elizabeth

Competitive highlights 

GP: Grand Prix; CS: Challenger Series; JGP: Junior Grand Prix

With Lauriault

For Canada

For France

With Elizabeth

References

External links 

 

1995 births
French male ice dancers
Living people
Sportspeople from Nogent-sur-Marne
Figure skaters at the 2018 Winter Olympics
Olympic figure skaters of France
Figure skaters at the 2012 Winter Youth Olympics